"Eyesore" is a song written by Janus. It is the 5th track from their third album Red Right Return, and was the first single released from the album in 2009. An acoustic version was exclusively released on KUPDs Acoustic 2010 compilation album.

Song
In an interview David Scotney said, “Eyesore” is about listening to your own voice, not letting others influence your thoughts and decisions, and being true to yourself. The title, “Eyesore,” is meant to define that moment of awareness where you realize the consequence of not following your own voice.

Chart performance

Music video
The music video of Eyesore was directed and edited by Noah Shulman. Video was shot in a green screen studio with all members individually. The music video shows the band in a uniform performing on stage in front of a huge crowd with respirators covering their faces.

Track listing

References

External links
 "Eysore" lyrics
 "About the lyrics"

2009 singles
2008 songs
Janus (American band) songs